The Heritage Village Open was a golf tournament on the LPGA Tour from 1971 to 1973. It was played at the Heritage Village Country Club in Southbury, Connecticut.

Winners
Heritage Village Open
1973 Susie Berning
1972 Judy Rankin

Heritage Open
1971 Sandra Palmer

References

Former LPGA Tour events
Golf in Connecticut
Sports competitions in Connecticut
History of women in Connecticut